Daniel McCoy may refer to:

 Colt McCoy (Daniel McCoy, born 1986), National Football League quarterback
 Dan McCoy (born 1978), American comedian
 Dan McCoy (sledge hockey) (born 1994), American ice hockey player
 Daniel McCoy (politician) (1845–1908), American politician in Michigan 
 Danny McCoy, fictional character on the television show Las Vegas
 Daniel McCoy, son of the mutineer William McCoy